PKX may refer to:

Beijing Daxing International Airport, IATA code PKX
POSCO, traded as PKX on NYSE
Tetracapsuloides, called PKX organism before it was identified

See also
Gumdoksuri-class patrol vessel, including PKX-A and PKX-B